Bernardino Halbherr (21 July 1844, Rovereto – 31 March 1934, Rovereto) was an Italian entomologist who specialised in Coleoptera and Heteroptera.

Halbherr was an accountant. He worked closely with two other Rovereto naturalists Giovanni Cobelli and Ruggero Cobelli. His collection is in the Museo Civico Rovereto.

References
Conci, C. 1975: Repertorio delle biografie e bibliografie degli scrittori e cultori italiani di entomologia.Mem. Soc. Ent. Ital. 48 1969(4) 817-1069 932 
Conci, C. & Poggi, R. 1996: Iconography of Italian Entomologists, with essential biographical data. Mem. Soc. Ent. Ital. 75 159-382, 418 Fig. 159-382, Portr. 
Heikertinger, F. 1935: Koleopterologische Rundschau 21 196 196-197

Italian entomologists
1844 births
1934 deaths